Cavendish may refer to:

People 

 The House of Cavendish, a British aristocratic family
 Margaret Cavendish (1623–1673), British poet, philosopher, and scientist
 Cavendish  (author) (1831–1899), pen name of Henry Jones, English author on card games and tennis
 Henry Cavendish (1731–1810), British natural philosopher and scientist
 Mark Cavendish (born 1985), Manx professional road and track cyclist
 Diana Cavendish from Little Witch Academia
 Thomas Cavendish (1560-1592), English sailor who circumnavigated (1586-1588).

Places

Australia
 County of Cavendish, Queensland
 Cavendish Road, Brisbane, Queensland
 Cavendish, Victoria

Bermuda
 Cavendish Tribe, original name of Devonshire Parish, Bermuda

Canada
 Cavendish, Alberta
 Cavendish, Newfoundland and Labrador
 Cavendish, a former township, subsequently merged and renamed to form Trent Lakes, Ontario
 Cavendish, Prince Edward Island
 Cavendish Beach, Prince Edward Island

England
 Cavendish, Suffolk
 Cavendish Square, London
 Cavendish Bridge
 Cavendish Golf Club, Buxton

New Zealand
 Mount Cavendish, Christchurch

United States
 Cavendish, Idaho
 Cavendish, Vermont, a town
 Cavendish (CDP), Vermont, the central village of the town
 Fort Cavendish, Illinois, British name for the captured French Fort de Chartres

Other places
 Cavendish (crater), a crater on the moon

Academic facilities
 Cavendish Laboratory at the University of Cambridge
 Cavendish School (disambiguation), various schools
 Cavendish Hall, one of the University of Nottingham Halls of Residence
 Cavendish University Zambia, a private university in Lusaka, Zambia

Other uses
 Cavendish banana, the dominant commercial variety of banana
 Cavendish tobacco, a process of cutting and curing tobacco
 Cavendish Invitational, high-stakes bridge tournament currently held in Monaco
 Cavendish experiment weighing the Earth
 Cavendish Motor Services, a bus company part-owned by Renown Travel, operating several routes in East Sussex, England
 "Cavendish Foods", a fictional supermarket chain appearing on the British sitcom To the Manor Born
 Cavendish (TV series), a 2019 CBC sitcom set in Cavendish, Prince Edward Island, Canada
 Cavendish Agri Services, Cavendish Farms, or Cavendish Produce, subsidiaries of Canadian conglomerate J. D. Irving
 Cavendish's Dikdik (Madoqua kirkii cavendishi), an animal subspecies

See also